Northwest Airlines Flight 1, registration NC17389, was a Lockheed Model 14 Super Electra aircraft which crashed in eastern Montana on Friday, January 13, 1939, approximately  southwest of the Miles City Airport. All four on board were killed in the accident.

Flight
Flight 1 normally originated from Chicago to Seattle, with intermediate stops in Minneapolis; Fargo, North Dakota; Bismarck, North Dakota; Miles City, Montana; Billings, Montana; Butte, Montana; and Spokane, Washington. On the date of the accident, the flight actually began in Minneapolis and departed at 4:00 PM CST. After the two stops in North Dakota, the flight reached Miles City at 7:41 PM MST to refuel and take on cargo.

Accident
Departure from Miles City was delayed for over an hour due to weather conditions at Billings, but the aircraft eventually departed at 9:14 PM, with only two passengers on board.

It then pulled up into a sharp climb, reached about 500 feet AGL again, turned left again and descended rapidly into a ravine approximately half-mile southwest of the field.

Investigation
Investigators with the Department of Commerce's Civil Aeronautics Authority (CAA), a predecessor organization to the Federal Aviation Administration (FAA) and National Transportation Safety Board (NTSB), determined that an intense fire had developed in the cockpit shortly after the aircraft had departed the airport.

Although the state of the wreckage prevented investigators from definitively pinpointing the exact origin of the fire, an area of severe burning was found close to the cross-feed fuel valve located in the cockpit between the pilot and co-pilot. Lockheed designers had not provided any method by which any fuel that did leak from the valve could safely be drained. It was also difficult to maintain or inspect the valve due to its location.

Recommendation
The CAA recommended that the cross-feed fuel system be relocated to allow for easier maintenance and inspection and to reduce the possibility of a cockpit fire caused by fuel leakage. They also recommended that areas of leakage in the fuel line be modified so as to allow for adequate drainage.

Aftermath
This accident occurred one year and three days after Northwest's Flight 2 crashed, also in Montana, in the Bridger Mountains northeast of Bozeman. These accidents, as well as two others which befell Northwest Super Electras in 1938, called into question the airworthiness and commercial potential of the model. Northwest sold off its fleet of Electras soon after this accident.

This flight number was used for many years on the trans-Pacific Los Angeles–Tokyo–Ho Chi Minh City route.  Northwest was acquired by Delta Air Lines in 2008, and a merger between the two airlines was finalized in 2010; the combined company retired the Northwest name and kept the Delta one.

See also
Aviation safety
List of accidents and incidents involving commercial aircraft

References

External links
CAA Accident Investigation Report, Northwest Airlines Flight 1 (PDF)
Report on Flight 1 at http://planecrashinfo.com

Airliner accidents and incidents in Montana
Airliner accidents and incidents caused by in-flight fires
Airliner accidents and incidents caused by design or manufacturing errors
Aviation accidents and incidents in the United States in 1939
Transportation in Custer County, Montana
1939 in Montana
Disasters in Montana
1